Hermann Lüdemann (August 5, 1880 – May 27, 1959) was a German politician (SPD). He was Minister-President of Schleswig-Holstein (1947–1949). He was born in Lübeck and died in Kiel.

External links 
 
 

1880 births
1959 deaths
Social Democratic Party of Germany politicians
Politicians from Lübeck
People from the Province of Schleswig-Holstein
Grand Crosses 1st class of the Order of Merit of the Federal Republic of Germany
Finance ministers of Prussia
Prussian politicians
Ministers-President of Schleswig-Holstein
Politicians from the Province of Silesia